Karen is an American sitcom that stars Debbie Watson in the title role of 16-year-old Karen Scott, and Gina Gillespie as her tomboyish little sister Mimi. It aired from 1964 to 1965.

Synopsis
Karen centers on the social life of 16-year old Karen Scott, a typical mid-1960s American teenager who lives in a fashionable apartment complex at 90 Bristol Court in Los Angeles, California, with her tomboyish younger sister Mimi and parents Steve and Barbara. Karen and the impish Mimi are a counterpoint to one another, each girl confounding the tolerant and loving Steve and Barbara in her own way. Karen is focused on having fun, and her impulsiveness often leads to misadventures when she ignores her parents' advice. Karen's friends include Janis, Candy, Peter, Spider Gibson, and David Rowe III. Cliff Murdock is the building superintendent and handyman at 90 Bristol Court.

Cast
 Karen Scott — Debbie Watson
 Steve Scott — Richard Denning
 Barbara Scott — Mary LaRoche
 Mimi Scott — Gina Gillespie
 Janis — Bernadette Withers
 Candy — Trudi Ames
 Peter — Teddy Quinn
 Spider Gibson — Murray MacLeod
 David Rowe III — Richard Dreyfuss (recurring)
 Cliff Murdock — Guy Raymond (October 1964–January 1965)

90 Bristol Court

Karen was one of three 30-minute sitcoms broadcast Monday nights under the umbrella title 90 Bristol Court; the other two were Harris Against the World, which followed Karen, and Tom, Dick and Mary, which completed the 90-minute programming block. Despite all three shows being set at the same Los Angeles apartment complex with the address 90 Bristol Court, the only connection the three series had was the character of handyman Cliff Murdoch (portrayed by Guy Raymond), who greeted the residents and visitors to 90 Bristol Court. After the last episodes of Harris Against the World and Tom, Dick and Mary aired on January 4, 1965, 90 Bristol Court ceased to be a programming entity, and handyman Murdoch disappeared from Karen as well.

Production

The Beach Boys performed Karen′s theme song, also entitled "Karen."

Broadcast history

The show premiered on NBC as 90 Bristol Court: Karen on October 5, 1964, and continued under that title through the broadcast of January 4, 1965. It drew low ratings: For the November-to-December 1964 reporting period, the Nielsen ratings ranked it 87th among the 96 prime-time network television shows. Tom, Dick and Mary fared only slightly better, and Harris Against the World had even lower ratings than Karen. In mid-November 1964 The New York Times reported that NBC planned to cancel both and Harris Against the World and Tom, Dick and Mary, effective in early January 1965. Their last episodes aired on January 4, 1965.

With the demise of Harris Against the World and Tom, Dick and Mary and with them the 90 Bristol Court programming concept, the 90 Bristol Court umbrella title was dropped from Karen and handyman Cliff Murdock disappeared from the show. From January 11, 1965, until the end of its run, the show  ran as a stand-alone series, titled simply Karen. Although Karen outlasted the other two 90 Bristol Court shows, NBC announced in February 1965 that it would not renew Karen for the 1965-1966 season. The last of the 28 original episodes  of Karen aired on April 19, 1965. NBC then broadcast prime-time reruns of Karen in its regular time slot, the last of them on August 30, 1965. Karen aired at 7:30 p.m. on Monday throughout its run.

Peter Tewksbury wrote, produced, and directed all three episodes that aired as part of 90 Bristol Court on November 23, 1964, and used the philosophy of Henry David Thoreau regarding simple living as a starting point for each of them: On Karen, Thoreau influenced Karen and her complicated love life when she mistakenly made three dates for the same Saturday night; on Harris Against the World, Thoreau inspired Harris to take his family fishing, only to find that he has to renew his driver's license that day; and on Tom, Dick and Mary, Dick used Thoreau's philosophy as he attempted to fix several broken household appliances.

Episodes
SOURCES Television Obscurities TV Guide 365: Monday, October 19th, 1964 Accessed 7 November 2021Television Obscurities TV Guide 365: Monday, November 2nd, 1964 Accessed 7 November 2021Television Obscurities TV Guide 365: Monday, November 30th, 1964 Accessed 7 November 2021Karen (television listing), Pittsburgh Post-Gazette, November 30, 1964, Page 47 Accessed 8 January 2022Television Obscurities Retrow Review  Karen (1964) – “Who’s Seymour?”, February 23, 2017 Accessed 7 November 2021

References

Footnotes

Bibliography
Tim Brooks and Earle Marsh, The Complete Directory to Prime Time Network and Cable TV Shows, 1946-Present (2003) 
TV Guide Guide to TV 2006 (2006)

External links

90 Bristol Court at Television Obscurities
Retro Review: Karen (1964) – “Who’s Seymour?” at Television Obscurities Accessed 4 November 2021
Karen opening credits on YouTube
Karen opening credits on YouTube
Karen opening credits with sponsor on YouTube
Karen closing credits on YouTube
Karen episode "Holiday in Ski Valley" on YouTube
Karen episode "Mimi's First Love" on YouTube

1964 American television series debuts
1965 American television series endings
1960s American sitcoms
American teen sitcoms
Black-and-white American television shows
English-language television shows
NBC original programming
Television series about sisters
Television series about teenagers
Television series by Universal Television
Television shows set in Los Angeles